Erich Martin Hering (10 November 1893, Heinersdorf – 18 August 1967, Berlin) was a German entomologist who specialised in leafmining insects, He was a curator in the Museum für Naturkunde in Berlin, where his collections of Lepidoptera, Coleoptera, Hymenoptera, Diptera are conserved. His collections of Agromyzidae are shared between MfN and the Agricultural School at  Portici now part of the University of Naples Federico II.

He also discovered a species of fly, Acanthonevra scutellopunctata in 1952.

Selected works
(1926) Die Ökologie der blattminierenden Insektenlarven. pp 253, 2 pl. Borntraeger, Berlin.
(1951) Biology of leaf-miners. Junk, The Hague. 
(1957) Bestimmungstabellen der Blattminen von Europa einschliesslich des Mittelmeerbeckens und der Kanarischen Inseln, vol. 1–3. Uitgeverij Dr. W. Junk, 's-Gravenhage.

References
 
Anonym 1967: [Hering, E. M.] Bull. Soc.ent. France Paris 72 221   
Anonym 1968: [Hering, E. M.] Mem. Ent. Soc. Amer. 61 555   
Hannemann 1968: [Hering, E. M.]  J. Lepidopt. Soc. 22 123–125   
Hering, E. M. 1968: Briefe über Blattminierer.  The Hague, Junk   
Kutzscher, C. & Taeger, A. 1998: Portraits und biographische Daten. In: Taeger, A. & Blank, S. M. 1998 (Hrsg.): Pflanzenwespen Deutschlands (Hymenoptera, Symphyta). Kommentierte Bestandsaufnahme.Goecke & Evers, Keltern : 331–336 333, Portr. 
Poggi, R. & Conci, C. 1996: [Hering, E. M.] Mem. Soc. Ent. Ital. 75 60 (Sammlungsverbleib)

1893 births
1967 deaths
Dipterists
Hymenopterists
German lepidopterists
20th-century German zoologists